Itay Neeman (born 1972) is a set theorist working as a professor of mathematics at the University of California, Los Angeles. He has made  major contributions to the theory of inner models, determinacy and forcing.

Early life and education
Neeman was born in 1972 in Safed, Israel. After studying mathematics at King's College London and the University of Oxford, he earned his Ph.D.  at the University of California, Berkeley, in 1996, under the supervision of John R. Steel.

Recognition
Neeman won a CAREER Award in 2001. He was an invited speaker at the International Congress of Mathematicians in 2006. In 2012, the Simons Foundation named Neeman as one of their Simons Fellows, in the inaugural year of the Simons Fellows program.

In 2019 he was awarded the Hausdorff Medal, by the European Set Theory Society. The award cited three of his papers for their work on "iterating forcing using side conditions and the tree property" as having been the most significant contribution to set theory in the previous five years.

Selected publications
.
. One of the papers cited for Neeman's Hausdorff Medal.
. One of the papers cited for Neeman's Hausdorff Medal.
. One of the papers cited for Neeman's Hausdorff Medal.

References

External links
 Home page at UCLA

Living people
1972 births
21st-century Israeli  mathematicians
Set theorists
University of California, Los Angeles faculty
Hausdorff Medal winners
Israeli emigrants to the United States
Israeli expatriates in the United Kingdom
Alumni of King's College London
Alumni of the University of Oxford
University of California, Berkeley alumni